The Fish Bed Formation is a geologic formation in Scotland, United Kingdom. The fluvial to lacustrine sandstones, shales, siltstones and conglomerates preserve flora, arthropods, among which eurypterids, invertebrates and early fish fossils dating back to the Wenlock epoch of the Silurian period.

Description 

The fish beds are contained within red-bed sequences comprising conglomerates, sandstones and siltstones that exhibit sedimentological features suggestive of deposition in terrestrial–fluviatile and lacustrine environments (Bluck 2002). The sporomorph assemblage from the Fish Bed Formation indicates that it is entirely non-marine and was most likely deposited in a relatively permanent lacustrine setting (Wellman and Richardson 1993).

The formation, at the time part of Avalonia, was deposited during the Grampian orogeny.

Fossil content 
The Fish Bed Formation has provided fossils of:

Fish 

 Birkenia sp.
 Lanarkia sp.
 Lasanius sp.

Arthropods 
 Casiogrammus ichthyeros

Eurypterids 

 Lanarkopterus dolichoschelus
 Parastylonurus ornatus
 Hughmilleria sp.

Invertebrates 
Gastropods
 Ateleaspis sp.

Flora 
 Plantae indet.

See also 
 List of fossiliferous stratigraphic units in Scotland

References

Bibliography 
 
 

Geologic formations of Scotland
Silurian System of Europe
Silurian Scotland
Wenlock epoch
Conglomerate formations
Sandstone formations
Shale formations
Siltstone formations
Fluvial deposits
Lacustrine deposits
Silurian southern paleotemperate deposits
Paleontology in Scotland
Formations